This page lists candidates contesting electorates in the 2020 New Zealand general election.

General electorates

Auckland Central

|-
!colspan=6| Retiring incumbents and withdrawn candidates
|-

|}

Banks Peninsula

|-
!colspan=6| Retiring incumbents and withdrawn candidates
|-

|}

Bay of Plenty

|}

Botany

|-
!colspan=6| Retiring incumbents and withdrawn candidates
|-

|}

Christchurch Central

|-
!colspan=6| Retiring incumbents and withdrawn candidates
|-

|}

Christchurch East

|}

Coromandel

|}

Dunedin

|-
!colspan=6| Retiring incumbents and withdrawn candidates
|-

|}

East Coast

|-
!colspan=6| Retiring incumbents and withdrawn candidates
|-

|}

East Coast Bays

|-
!colspan=6| Retiring incumbents and withdrawn candidates
|-

|}

Epsom

|}

Hamilton East

|-
!colspan=6| Retiring incumbents and withdrawn candidates
|-

|}

Hamilton West

|}

Hutt South

|}

Ilam

|-
!colspan=6| Retiring incumbents and withdrawn candidates
|-

|-

|}

Invercargill

|-
!colspan=6| Retiring incumbents and withdrawn candidates
|-

|}

Kaikōura

|}

Kaipara ki Mahurangi

|}

Kelston

|}

Mana

|-
!colspan=6| Retiring incumbents and withdrawn candidates
|-

|}

Māngere

|-
!colspan=6| Retiring incumbents and withdrawn candidates
|-

|}

Manurewa

|-
!colspan=6| Retiring incumbents and withdrawn candidates
|-

|}

Maungakiekie

|}

Mount Albert

|-
!colspan=6| Retiring incumbents and withdrawn candidates
|-

|}

Mount Roskill

|}

Napier

-->

|}

Nelson

|}

New Lynn

|-
!colspan=6| Retiring incumbents and withdrawn candidates
|-

|}

New Plymouth

|}

North Shore

|-
!colspan=6| Retiring incumbents and withdrawn candidates
|-

|}

Northcote

|}

Northland

|-
!colspan=6| Retiring incumbents and withdrawn candidates
|-

|}

Ōhāriu

|}

Ōtaki

|-
!colspan=6| Retiring incumbents and withdrawn candidates
|-

|}

Pakuranga

|-
!colspan=6| Retiring incumbents and withdrawn candidates
|-

|}

Palmerston North

|-
!colspan=6| Retiring incumbents and withdrawn candidates
|-

|}

Panmure-Ōtāhuhu

|}

Papakura

|-
!colspan=6| Retiring incumbents and withdrawn candidates
|-

|}

Port Waikato

|-
!colspan=6| Retiring incumbents and withdrawn candidates
|-

|}

Rangitata

|-
!colspan=6| Retiring incumbents and withdrawn candidates
|-

|}

Rangitīkei

|-
!colspan=6| Retiring incumbents and withdrawn candidates
|-

|-

|}

Remutaka

|}

Rongotai

|}

Rotorua

|}

Selwyn

|-
!colspan=6| Retiring incumbents and withdrawn candidates
|-

|}

Southland

|-
!colspan=6| Retiring incumbents and withdrawn candidates
|-

|}

Taieri

|-
!colspan=6| Retiring incumbents and withdrawn candidates
|-

|}

Takanini

|-
!colspan=6| Retiring incumbents and withdrawn candidates
|-

|}

Tāmaki

|}

Taranaki-King Country

|}

Taupō

|-
!colspan=6| Retiring incumbents and withdrawn candidates
|-

|}

Tauranga

|}

Te Atatū

|}

Tukituki

|}

Upper Harbour

|-
!colspan=6| Retiring incumbents and withdrawn candidates
|-

|}

Waikato

|-
!colspan=6| Retiring incumbents and withdrawn candidates
|-

|}

Waimakariri

|-
!colspan=6| Retiring incumbents and withdrawn candidates
|-

|}

Wairarapa

|-
!colspan=6| Retiring incumbents and withdrawn candidates
|-

|}

Waitaki

|-
!colspan=6| Retiring incumbents and withdrawn candidates
|-

|}

Wellington Central

|}

West Coast-Tasman

|}

Whanganui

|}

Whangaparāoa

|}

Whangārei

|-
!colspan=6| Retiring incumbents and withdrawn candidates
|-

|}

Wigram

|}

Māori electorates

Hauraki-Waikato

|-
!colspan=6| Retiring incumbents and withdrawn candidates
|-

|}

Ikaroa-Rāwhiti

|}

Tāmaki Makaurau

|}

Te Tai Hauāuru

|}

Te Tai Tokerau

|-
!colspan=6| Retiring incumbents and withdrawn candidates
|-

|}

Te Tai Tonga

|}

Waiariki

|}

See also

 Party lists in the 2020 New Zealand general election

References

2020 New Zealand general election
Candidates 2020